The 12915 / 12916 Ashram A.C  Express is an A.C Superfast Express train that runs between  and Old Delhi in India. It is a daily service. It operates as train number 12915 from Ahmedabad Junction to Old Delhi and as train number 12916 in the reverse direction.

The train's route runs on a broad-gauge section converted from metre gauge in the 1990s. During the metre gauge era, this train ran as the 505-MG / 506-MG Ashram Express. This was the 2nd fastest train in – Mainline after 501-MG / 502-MG Delhi Junction– Pink City MG Express.

Coaches

The 12915 / 12916 Ashram Express presently has 1 AC 1st Class, 1 AC 1st Class cum AC 2 tier, 1 AC 2 tier, 5 AC 3 tier, 7Sleeper class, 2 General Unreserved coaches & 2 generator cars, from which (1–40) seats of 1st general bogie are reserved for ladies and (41–50) seats are for person with disabilities. As with most train services in India, coach composition may be amended at the discretion of Indian Railways depending on demand.

Service

As its average speed in both directions is above  and maximum 125kmph (77 mph), as per Indian Railways rules, its fare has a Superfast surcharge. In addition, it gets priority over local (commuter) trains, standard express, passenger trains and most freight trains. Now days, this train is 4th fastest train from Delhi to Ahmedabad City, after 2 Rajdhani's and Humsafar express, though garibrath express is more slow than this train.

Route & Halts

The train is runs from Ahmedabad Junction via Sabarmati Junction,  to Old Delhi.

Traction

This route is now fully electrified, it is hauled by a Vadodara Loco Shed based WAP-7 or electric locomotive from Ahmedabad Junction to Old Delhi. Very few times it is hauled by Gandhidham Loco Shed  based WDG -4  loco

Time-Table

 12915 Ashram Express leaves Ahmedabad Junction every day at 18:30 hrs IST and reaches Old Delhi at 10:10 hrs IST the next day.
 12916 Ashram Express leaves Old Delhi every day at 16:00 hrs IST and reaches Ahmedabad Junction at 07:00 hrs IST the next day.

Timings during metre gauge era was:-Ahmedabad Junction departure 14.15 hrs & Old Delhi Junction arrival 10.00 hrs as 505-MG. In return, Old Delhi Junction departure 16.00 hrs & Ahmedabad Junction arrival 11.45 hrs.

Rake sharing

The train sharing its rake with 12461 / 12462 Mandore Express

See also 
 Mandore Express
Indian Railways

References

Transport in Ahmedabad
Transport in Delhi
Railway services introduced in 1997
Named passenger trains of India
Rail transport in Gujarat
Rail transport in Rajasthan
Rail transport in Haryana
Express trains in India
Rail transport in Delhi